The Mongolian Stock Exchange (MSE) (Mongolian: Монголын Хөрөнгийн Бирж/Mongolyn Khöröngiin Birj) is Mongolia's sole stock exchange. It is based in Ulaanbaatar and was established in January 1991 by the decree of the Mongolian Government to privatize state-owned assets.

The MSE has seen rapid growth since 2006. In 2010, the MSE was the world's best-performing stock market after an increase of 121 percent. MSE ranked the second best performing stock exchange in the world with 57.8 percent increase after Venezuela Caracas Stock Exchange, which increased by 80.8 percent. As of September 2022, it has 180 listed companies with a combined market capitalization of 4.9 trillion MNT (US$1.5 billion).

History

Role in privatisation of state assets
The Mongolian Stock Exchange was established in 1991 as a vehicle to implement the government's plan for privatisation of large state-owned enterprises. In an attempt to ensure an equitable distribution of assets, the Mongolian government chose to instantiate a voucher-based scheme; one blue voucher worth MNT7,000 was issued to every citizen born before 31 May 1991 for the purchase of shares in large enterprises, and a nationwide network of 29 brokerage houses was established to take their orders. Red vouchers worth MNT3,000 were also issued for the purchase of the assets of small enterprises which would not be listed on the exchange; unlike the blue vouchers, these could be traded in secondary markets. Initially, stock exchange officials hoped to privatise 80% of state assets, but, on 7 June 1991, Government Resolution No. 170 announced that the state would retain a stake of 50% in some large enterprises; mining, energy, transportation, communications, and water supply companies were excluded from the privatisation scheme entirely.

Auctions officially began on 7 February 1992; shares in three companies were auctioned off. The first day's turnover was 16,000 shares, valued at US$15,000; that grew by over twelve times to 200,000 shares in March. Auctions continued to be held weekly; regional brokers collected vouchers and share orders from individuals, and submitted bids through their floor traders in Ulaanbaatar. Communication was often accomplished by modem. Trading hours were restricted to two hours on one day per week, expanding to two five-hour days per week in July; the thirty exchange officials used the remainder of their working time to prepare infrastructure and legal recommendations for trading in the secondary market. By October, 121 enterprises had been floated on the exchange.

Mongolia soon boasted the world's highest rate of share ownership, as more and more people redeemed their vouchers for shares. Family members were permitted to transfer their vouchers to each other, so not everyone became a stockholder, but the peak number of shareholders was estimated at one million, or 43% of the population at the time. In the end, a total of 475 companies worth MNT17.33 billion were privatised by auctions and listed on the Mongolian Stock Exchange, including MNT5.04 billion worth of manufacturing companies, MNT4.09 billion of agricultural companies, MNT1.27 billion of construction companies, MNT1.25 billion of state farms, MNT580 million of trading companies, MNT520 million of transport companies, and MNT280 million of companies in other sectors. Some sources suggest that illegal trading in vouchers occurred in advance of the privatisations; however, statistics from the exchange itself show that the number of shareholders each enterprise initially emerged with corresponded roughly to the number of shareholders one would expect if each shareholder had spent all his vouchers to purchase shares in a single enterprise. This initially led to a very equitable distribution of shares; individuals found themselves unable to buy more shares, or sell the ones they already had, until the government passed a new securities law.

Primary and Secondary market

Secondary trading finally began on 28 August 1995, open to both domestic and international investors. Bids were placed on 430 out of 475 listed stocks, and trading occurred in 16 stocks; total turnover was 12,776 shares worth MNT2.2 million tugriks (US$4,850). The largest gain was in Sor, which rose by 19% from MNT580 to MNT690. However, the secondary market quickly exposed the weakness of many of the newly privatised companies; share prices remained depressed throughout 1996, and the number of MSE-listed companies contracted from 475 to 402. Market capitalisation stabilised around MNT15 billion in 1997, with a daily turnover of 80,000 to 300,000 from MNT16 - 80 million. Furthermore, many small shareholders sold their shares, allowing a few domestic and foreign investors to gain majority holdings in the remaining listed companies. The total number of shareholders had shrunk to a mere 135,000 by 1997. One public offering of additional shares from an already-listed enterprise was carried out in 1996, but the regulators refused to give approval for initial public offerings by new private companies, due to the lack of regulation and experience in underwriting. In 1998, the exchange moved to electronic trading. In 2000, the exchange also began to offer trading facilities for Mongolian government bonds. As of December 2003, market capitalisation in local terms had expanded to MNT52 billion, which was still a mere 5% of GDP. Only 30 of the companies listed on the exchange were actively traded.

Government bonds, rather than stocks, came to be the Mongolian Stock Exchange's biggest business as soon as they began being auctioned through the exchange in November 2000; previously, they had been sold directly to banks. The following year, the Barilga Corporation, a construction company, became the first to sell corporate bonds through the MSE, with a US$4.4 million issue. In 2004, bond trading accounted for 96% of total securities turnover on the exchange. By that same year, the stock market had recovered somewhat as well, but retail investors remained suspicious of trading due to volatility and lack of transparency; MSE officials estimated that 80% of listed companies were majority-owned by private individuals. By February 2007, trading hours had expanded to one hour on each weekday. Weekly stock turnover at 7 September 2007 was 1.8 million shares valued at MNT1.7 billion, while 50,000 government bonds traded for a total consideration of MNT4.8 billion. Furthermore, the number of registered shareholders bounced back to 483,100, three-and-a-half times the figure a decade earlier, and nearly half the peak number seen in 1995 after privatisations had completed. Total market capitalisation as of September 2006 was MNT97 billion (US$83 million).

Although the Mongolian Stock Exchange used to be the world's smallest stock exchange by market capitalisation in 2006, it has become the world's best performing stock market in 2010. It was the second best performing stock market in 2011. Its market capitalization quadrupled to $2 billion in end of 2011 from 2008 and is speculated that it can get to $45 billion in five years.

Physical location

The Mongolian Stock Exchange is located in the former Children's Cinema building near Sükhbaatar Square, next to the headquarters of Mongolia Telecom Company and across from the Mongolian parliament's buildings. It was refurbished at a cost of US$4.5 million prior to the official start of trading; seats and screens were removed, a trading floor was created and equipped with computers, and automatic sinks were installed in the bathrooms. The building itself is a pink-and-white neo-classical-style structure. One corner of the building has been partitioned off to serve as an internet cafe. Due to the color of its building, the Financial Times correspondent, Leslie Hook, defined it the pink house of equities. Since then, the building has been painted gray.

People and relationship-building
The Mongolian Stock Exchange has been praised for their approach to customer relationship management. To commemorate their 16th anniversary, they organised a sports day, in which broker/dealers and the exchange fielded teams and competed against each other. They were also described as "punching above its weight" in its international knowledge-sharing efforts. It joined the Federation of Euro-Asian Stock Exchanges in 1998, and, in June 2006, formed a partnership with the Korea Exchange. The chief executive officer of the Mongolian Stock Exchange visited the Korea Stock Exchange in July 2007; officials from the Korea Stock Exchange paid a return visit the following month.

Mongolian Stock Exchange sealed a deal with London Stock Exchange Group to modernize the MSE under an agreement to make it in level of world standard. LSE will manage and provide expertise and someone from LSE might lead the MSE. This comes as there is a mining boom happening in Mongolia and need for robust, private and attractive stock exchange.

Naidansuren Zoljargal, one of the founders of the Mongolian Stock Exchange, was educated in Hungary and later studied finance at the Harvard University in the United States, and founded the Mongolian Stock Exchange when he was 27 years old. His young age prompted American magazine Asia, Inc. to dub him the "Boy Wonder of the Mongolian Stock Exchange". His older brother, Naidansurengiin Jargalsaikhan, was formerly head of the Bank of Mongolia, but was ousted from his job after the loss of US$100 million of foreign reserves, which had been invested in futures and foreign currency.

In 2011 Baatar Bold became chairman, he was the CEO of Newcom Group and former head of JP Morgan's Russia and Commonwealth of Independent States department.

Trading and technology

The MSE is open for trading Monday through Friday from 10:00 am to 01:00 pm, with the exception of holidays declared by the Mongolian Government. MSE divides its listed companies into Board I, II and III to appropriately appraise and classify companies in order to increase liquidity and quality of listings.

Within the framework of "Master Service Agreement" experts from Millennium IT Software Limited, (a subsidiary of London Stock Exchange group) installed Millennium IT integrated trading platform, which consists of Millennium Exchange, Millennium CSD, Millennium Surveillance and Millennium Depositary systems at the Mongolian Stock Exchange and Securities Clearing House and Central Depositary /SCHCD/ in 2012.

According to "MSE securities Index Calculation Rule", securities basket of MSE Top-20 index, the main indicator of the Mongolian stock market, is renewed once a year. It is calculated based on the market capitalization and average daily average trading value of the top 20 securities listed on the Mongolia Stock Exchange. See: MSE TOP-20 Index

Timeline

18 January 1991: Pre-government decree No.22, the Mongolian Stock Exchange (MSE) was established in Ulaanbaatar, Mongolia.
7 February 1992: The MSE started its primary market trading.
28 August 1995: The MSE started its secondary market trading.
25 October 1996: The first trading day for government bonds.
1 October 1998: The MSE joined the Federation of Euro-Asian Stock Exchanges as a full member
8 June 2001: The MSE started to trade corporate bonds.
3 December 2002: Memorandum of Understanding on Mutual Cooperation with Taiwan Stock Exchange was signed.
26 March 2003: The MSE was reorganized as state owned Shareholding Company.
31 October 2005: "Training center" of capital market was established at MSE.
1 January 2006: Finance Regulatory Committee of Mongolia was established.
15 June 2006: Memorandum of Understanding with Korea Exchange was signed.
19 July 2006: Memorandum of Understanding with Istanbul Stock Exchange was signed.
5 March 2008: The MSE established "Information transmission" agreement with Bloomberg.
10 April 2008: The Mongolian Stock Exchange became a member of the Asia Pacific Stock Exchanges Association
10 April 2008: Memorandum of Understanding with Singapore Stock Exchange was signed.
15 May 2008: Memorandum of Understanding with Tokyo Stock Exchange was signed.
17 Mar 2009: Memorandum of Understanding with Moscow Interbank Currency Exchange was signed.
31 August 2010: Market value of MSE, exceeded MNT 1 trillion.
7 April 2011: Mongolian Stock Exchange and State Property Committee of Mongolia signed the "Strategic Partnership Agreement" with London Exchange Group.
02 August 2012: "Millennium IT" integrated system of trading, settlement, surveillance and depository introduced into Mongolian capital market.
2013: Mongolian Capital Market included in FTSE Watch List for further review the possible inclusion of Mongolia as a Frontier market.
2013: The Parliament of Mongolia passed new Securities Law within accordance of international securities law standard. 
28 July 2014: MSE ALL index started being calculated.
02 December 2015: Mongolian Stock Exchange became a self-regulated organization.
2015: The trading value of Mongolian Stock Exchange reached an all-time high of MNT560 billion.
05 January 2016: Process of privatization of state-owned properties went through Mongolian Stock Exchange started.

See also
List of companies listed on the Mongolian Stock Exchange
List of East Asian stock exchanges
Ulaanbaatar Securities Exchange

References

External links

 Mongolian Stock Exchange

1991 establishments in Mongolia
Stock exchanges in Mongolia